Anders Roth (born 17 March 1967) is a retired Finnish football midfielder.

References 

1967 births
Living people
Swedish-speaking Finns
Finnish footballers
Hangö IK players
Örgryte IS players
Myllykosken Pallo −47 players
FinnPa players
Finland international footballers
Association football midfielders
Finnish expatriate footballers
Expatriate footballers in Sweden
Finnish expatriate sportspeople in Sweden
Veikkausliiga players
Ykkönen players
Kakkonen players
Allsvenskan players
Superettan players
People from Hanko
Sportspeople from Uusimaa